The Woman's Medical College of Pennsylvania (WMCP) was founded in 1850, and was the second medical institution in the world established to train women in medicine to earn the M.D. degree. The New England Female Medical College had been established two years earlier in 1848. Originally called the Female Medical College of Pennsylvania, the college changed its name in 1867 to Woman's Medical College of Pennsylvania. The associated Woman's Hospital of Philadelphia was founded in 1861. Upon deciding to admit men in 1970, the college was renamed as the Medical College of Pennsylvania (MCP).

In 1930, the college opened its new campus in East Falls, which combined teaching and the clinical care of a hospital in one overall facility. It was the first purpose-built hospital in the nation. In 1993, the college and hospital merged with Hahnemann Medical School. In 2003, the two colleges were absorbed by the Drexel University College of Medicine.

Founding 
R.C. Smedley's History of the Underground Railroad cites Dr. Bartholomew Fussell with proposing, in 1846, the idea for a college that would train female doctors. It was a tribute to his departed sister, who Bartholomew believed could have been a doctor if women had been given the opportunity at that time. Her daughter, Graceanna Lewis, was to become one of the first woman scientists in the United States. At a meeting at his house, The Pines, in Kennett Square, Pennsylvania, Fussell invited five doctors to carry out his idea. The doctors invited were: Edwin Fussell (Bartholomew's nephew) M.D., Franklin Taylor, M.D., Ellwood Harvey, M.D., Sylvester Birdsall, M.D., and Dr. Ezra Michener. Graceanna also attended. Dr. Fussell would support the college, but had little to do with it after it started in 1850 in Philadelphia.

Ellwood Harvey (who attended the 1846 meeting, but did not start teaching at the college until 1852), helped keep the school alive, along with Edwin Fussell. Dr. Harvey not only taught a full course load but took on a second load when another professor backed out.

Dr. Harvey also continued his medical practice. Among his patients were William Still and his family. Still, a renowned Philadelphia abolitionist, became a historian of the Underground Railroad after keeping extensive records of fugitive slaves aided in Philadelphia rescues.

Harvey was later sued for libel by Dr. Joseph S. Longshore, an instructor at the college who was forced out. Longshore started a rival women's medical college at the Penn Medical University. Using his previous connections from the Female Medical College, Longshore began to raise money for his own college.

Clara Marshall (1847–1931) graduated from the college. She served as dean from 1888 to 1917 and thought of Edwin Fussell as the founder of the school. Other students credited Longshore and William J. Mullen as being primary founders in terms of their contributions. Most considered these three men, whether official founder or not, to be instrumental in the creation of the Female Medical College of Pennsylvania.

The Feminist Movement during the early to mid 19th century generated support for the Female Medical College of Pennsylvania. The Society of Friends in Philadelphia, a large group of Quakers, were supportive of the women's rights movements and the development of the Female MCP.

MCP was initially located in the rear of 229 Arch Street, Philadelphia (the address was later changed to 627 Arch Street when Philadelphia renumbered streets in 1858). In July 1861, the board of corporators of the Female Medical College of Pennsylvania chose to rent rooms for the college from the Woman's Hospital of Philadelphia on North College Avenue.

Deans
The first dean of what was then known as the Female Medical College was a man: Nathaniel R. Mosely, appointed 1850–1856. The second dean was also a man, Edwin B. Fussell, who held the position from 1856 to 1866.

From then on, the Woman's College had a long history of female deans, lasting almost 100 years. The first woman to be a dean of this (or any) medical school was Ann Preston. The following women were deans of the college in the years stated:

 1866–1872, Ann Preston
 1872–1874, Emeline Horton Cleveland
 1874–1886, Rachel Bodley
 1886/1888–1917, Clara Marshall
 1917–1940, Martha Tracy (Henry Jump served as interim dean during Tracy's sabbatical.)
 1940/1943–1943/1946, Margaret Craighill
 1946–1963, Marion Spencer Fay

No woman was found to replace Marion Fay. After her, the position of dean was held by Glen R. Leymaster from 1964 to 1970, at which time the institution became known as the Medical College of Pennsylvania.

Woman's Hospital of Philadelphia 

In part to provide clinical experience for WMC students, a group of Quaker women, particularly Ann Preston, founded the Woman's Hospital of Philadelphia in 1861. In 1929, the West Philadelphia Hospital for Women merged with the Woman's Hospital of Philadelphia, retaining the latter's name.

Issues in clinical training 
The Female Medical College of Pennsylvania faced difficulties in providing clinical training for its students. Almost all medical institutions were confronted with the demand for more clinical practice due to the rise of surgery, physical diagnosis, and clinical specialties. During the 1880s, clinical instruction at the Woman's Medical College of Pennsylvania relied mainly on the demonstration clinics.

In 1887, Anna Broomall, professor of obstetrics for the Woman's Medical College of Pennsylvania, established a maternity outpatient service in a poor area of South Philadelphia for the purpose of student education. By 1895, many students cared for three or four women who were giving birth.

East Falls campus and Drexel University 
In the late 1920s, the college raised money to build a new campus. Designed by Ritter & Shay, the most successful of the Philadelphia urban architecture firms in the 1920s, the East Falls Campus was the first purpose-built hospital in the nation. The design allowed both teaching and hospital care to take place in one facility, helping provide for more clinical care. Post-WWII housing shortages in the city were a catalyst for development of additions to the East Falls Campus, the first of which was the Ann Preston Building (designed by Thaddeus Longstreth), which provided housing and classrooms for student nurses.

Today, the building is known as the Falls Center. It is operated by Iron Stone Strategic Capital Partners as student housing, commercial space, and medical offices.

In 1993 the Medical College of Pennsylvania merged with Hahnemann Medical College, retaining its Queen Lane campus. In 2003, the two medical colleges were absorbed as a part of Drexel University College of Medicine, creating new opportunities for the large student body for clinical practice in settings ranging from urban hospitals to small rural practices.

Notable alumnae
The following is a list of Woman's Medical College of Pennsylvania alumni (by century of graduation and in alphabetical order by last name) who are notable for their medical career.

19th century 
 Caroline Still Anderson (class of 1878), one of the first African American female physicians
 Saleni Armstrong-Hopkins (class of 1885), medical missionary in India
 Anandibai Gopal Joshi (class of 1886), first female doctor from India
 Alice Bennett (class of 1880), chief physician and first woman superintendent of the women's department of the State Hospital for the Insane in Norristown, Pennsylvania.
 Anna Broomall (class of 1871), professor of obstetrics and founder of the first outpatient maternity and prenatal care clinic in the United States
 Margaret F. Butler (class of 1894), professor of otorhinolaryngology and first woman to preside over an international congress of physicians
 Lucilla Green Cheney (class of 1875), medical missionary in India
 Louise M. Harvey Clarke (class of 1892), writer, speaker, and clubwoman in Los Angeles and Riverside counties, California
 Isabel Cobb (class of 1892), first woman physician in Indian territory 
 Elizabeth D. A. Cohen (class of 1857), first woman licensed to practice medicine in the state of Louisiana.
 Rebecca Cole (class of 1867), the second African-American female physician in the United States
Lucinda L. Combs (class of 1870), first female medical missionary in China, started first Women's Hospital in Peking
Katherine Neel Dale. medical missionary
 Halle Tanner Dillon Johnson, first female African American doctor in Alabama
 Mary J. Scarlett Dixon (class of 1857), physician
 Caroline Matilda Dodson (class of 1874), physician
 Jane Lord Hersom (class of 1896), physician and suffragist
 Matilda Evans (class of 1897), first African American female physician licensed to practice in South Carolina
 Louise Celia Fleming (class of 1895), first African American woman to attend and graduate
 Elizabeth Follansbee (class of 1877), first female medical school faculty member in California and first female member of the Los Angeles County Medical Association
 Marie K. Formad (class of 1886), born in Russia, served in France during World War I
 Anna Martha Fullerton (class of 1882), born in India, later taught at the WMC
 Cordelia A. Greene (1831-1905), physician, social reformer
 Eliza Ann Grier (class of 1897), the first African-American female physician licensed to practice in Georgia
Mary Wade Griscom (class of 1891), obstetrician in Philadelphia, and overseas in China, India, and Persia
 Rosetta Sherwood Hall, (class of 1889) American-born Canadian medical missionary and educator in Korea.
 Susan Hayhurst, (class of 1857) the first woman to receive a pharmacy degree in the United States
 Amanda Hickey (class of 1870), surgeon
 Sabat Islambouli, first licensed female doctor in Syria
 Halle Tanner Dillon Johnson, (class of 1891) the first woman to become a doctor in Alabama.
 Verina M. Harris Morton Jones (class of 1888), the first woman licensed to practice in Mississippi.
 Agnes Kemp (1823–1908), (class of 1879) the first woman to practice medicine in Dauphin County, Pennsylvania
 Anna Sarah Kugler (class of 1879) was the first medical missionary of the Evangelical Lutheran General Synod of the United States of North America and served in India for 47 years.
 Ruth Webster Lathrop (class of 1891), taught at the WMC from 1904 to 1923
 Clara Marshall (class of 1875), dean of Woman's Medical College from 1888 to 1917
 Lillie Rosa Minoka-Hill, (class of 1899) the second Native American woman to earn a medical degree.
Amanda Taylor Norris (class of 1880), the first woman physician in Maryland
 Keiko Okami, one of the earliest licensed female doctors in Japan, the first being Ogino Ginko
 Susan La Flesche Picotte, (class of 1889) the first Native American female physician
 Anna M. Longshore Potts (1829–1912), one of eight women in the school's first graduating class 
 Clara Swain, (class of 1869) the first female medical missionary to India from the United States
 Jennie Kidd Trout, (class of 1875) first female licensed medical doctor in Canada
 Charlotte Whitehead Ross, a Canadian female physician who practiced in Montreal and Manitoba in the late 1800s and early 1900s.
 Harriot Kezia Hunt, Honorable MD recipient, women's rights activist, teacher.
 Elizabeth Reifsnyder, (class of 1881) opened first woman's hospital in Shanghai
 Lilian Welsh (class of 1889), physician and educator, advocate for public health and preventative medicine
 Mary Holloway Wilhite (class of 1856), physician and philanthropist
 Charlotte Yhlen (1839–1920), first Swedish female physician
 Bertha Lund Glaeser (1862-1939), physician

20th century 
 Virginia M. Alexander (class of 1925), obstetrics and gynecology, Founder of Aspiranto Health Home to serve low income African American communities 
 Eleanor Jane Taylor Calverley (1908), medical missionary to Kuwait
 Myrtelle Canavan (class of 1905), early neuropathologist who first described a form of leukodystrophy that would eventually be named after her, Canavan's disease.
 Emmy Behn (class 1908), Dr. med., early German-born physician, gynecologist and publicist in Friedensau (Sanatorium), Berlin (Krankenhaus Waldfriede) and Kassel in Germany
 Ruth Bleier, (class of 1949) neurophysiologist, and one of the first feminist scholars to explore how gender biases have shaped biology.
 Rita Sapiro Finkler, (class of 1915) Ukrainian-born endocrinologist, gynecologist and pediatrician
 Saniya Habboub, (class of 1931) Lebanese medical doctor
Eleanor Montague (1950) American radiologist and educator who advanced breast cancer radiation therapies
 Joanne Overleese, general surgeon, as well as one of the few doctors to have played in All-American Girls Professional Baseball League history
 Ellen Culver Potter (class of 1903), physician and public health official
 Ingeborg Syllm Rapoport (1912-2017), pediatrician & neonatologist and at age 102, the oldest person to receive a doctorate.
Eva Reich, Austrian-born pediatrician and internationally known lecturer, daughter of controversial psychoanalyst Dr. Wilhelm Reich. 
 Patricia Robertson, a NASA astronaut and physician.
 Kazue Togasaki, (class of 1933) one of the earliest women of Japanese ancestry to earn a medical degree in the United States.
 Martha Tracy (class of 1904), dean of Woman's Medical College from 1917 to 1940
 Gisela von Poswik (class of 1911), German-born hospital administrator, specialist in radiology
 Mildred Mitchell-Bateman (class of 1946) first African American woman to hold an office in the American Psychiatric Association as vice president. Founded the Marshall University Department of Psychiatry and namesake of Mildred Mitchell-Bateman Hospital, West Virginia's state psychiatric hospital.
 Patricia Flint Borns (class of 1948), prior acting director of the Department of Radiology at Children's Hospital of Philadelphia, head the radiology departments at Hahnemann University Hospital, and Nemours Alfred I. duPont Hospital for Children

See also
 List of defunct medical schools in the United States
 List of female scientists before the 20th century
 Women in medicine

References

Further research
 Archives at Drexel University College of Medicine
 Woman's Medical College of Pennsylvania materials in the South Asian American Digital Archive (SAADA)
 

 
Former women's universities and colleges in the United States
Universities and colleges in Philadelphia
1850 establishments in Pennsylvania
East Falls, Philadelphia